Henrik Nádler (19 March 1901 – 12 May 1944) was a Hungarian international footballer who played as a left midfielder. He was a seven-time Hungarian champion while playing for MTK Budapest.

Biography
Nádler was born in Budapest and was Jewish. He was the son of Izsák, a suitcase maker, and Roza Acht, and had six siblings: Bertalan, Emma, Gizella, Illés, Renee, and Rozalia.

He played football for MTK Budapest between 1919 and 1930. Nádler was a seven-time league champion for MTK (1919–20, 1920–21, 1921–22, 1922–23, 1923–24, 1924–25, and 1928–29) and two-time Hungarian Cup winner (1923 and 1925). He scored six goals in 107 matches in all competitions for the club.

Between 1924 and 1926, Nádler earned seven caps for the Hungary national team. He was a member of the team that participated in the 1924 Summer Olympics, but he did not play in any matches.

Nádler died as a laborer at the hands of the Nazis during World War II. While the place and time of his death is given in some sources as Mauthausen concentration camp in 1945, he died in Germany, in Buchenwald concentration camp, on 12 May 1944.

References

External links
 

1901 births
1944 deaths
Hungarian Jews
Hungarian footballers
Jewish footballers
Jewish Hungarian sportspeople
Association football midfielders
MTK Budapest FC players
Nemzeti Bajnokság I players
Hungary international footballers
Olympic footballers of Hungary
Footballers at the 1924 Summer Olympics
Hungarian civilians killed in World War II
Hungarian Jews who died in the Holocaust
Hungarian people who died in Buchenwald concentration camp
Hungarian World War II forced labourers
Footballers from Budapest